Sean O'Malley may refer to:
 Seán Patrick O'Malley (born 1944), American Catholic Archbishop of Boston and cardinal
 Sean O'Malley (fighter) (born 1994), American mixed martial artist